Valiyaperumpuzha is a village situated in Mavelikkara, on the banks of the Achankovil river, in between Mavelikkara Municipality, Chennithala Panchayat, and Chettikulangara Panchayat in Kerala, India.

St Sebastian's Roman Catholic Church is situated at Valiyaperumpuzha which comes under the Mavelikkara Forane in Roman Catholic Diocese of Quilon.
Chennithala Palliyodam(snake boat) is another attraction.

References

Villages in Alappuzha district